Indian Springs is an unincorporated community in Mendocino County, California. It lies at an elevation of 1197 feet (365 m).  It is along the Middle Fork of the Eel River, east of Laytonville, California.

References

Unincorporated communities in California
Unincorporated communities in Mendocino County, California